The Flipped SU(5) model is a grand unified theory (GUT) first contemplated by  Stephen Barr in 1982, and by Dimitri Nanopoulos and others in 1984. Ignatios Antoniadis, John Ellis, John Hagelin, and Dimitri Nanopoulos developed the supersymmetric flipped SU(5), derived from the deeper-level superstring.

Some current efforts to explain the theoretical underpinnings for observed neutrino masses are being developed in the context of supersymmetric flipped .

Flipped  is not a fully unified model, because the  factor of the Standard Model gauge group is within the  factor of the GUT group. The addition of states below Mx in this model, while solving certain threshold correction issues in string theory, makes the model merely descriptive, rather than predictive.

The model
The flipped  model states that the gauge group is:

Fermions form three families, each consisting of the representations

 for the lepton doublet, L, and the up quarks ;
 for the quark doublet, Q, the down quark,  and the right-handed neutrino, ;
 for the charged leptons, .

This assignment includes three right-handed neutrinos, which have never been observed, but are often postulated  to explain the lightness of the observed neutrinos and neutrino oscillations.

The  representations transform under this subgroup as the reducible representation as follows:

 (uc and l)
 (q, dc and νc)
 (ec)
.

Comparison with the standard SU(5)
In comparison with the standard , the flipped  can accomplish the spontaneous symmetry breaking using Higgs fields of dimension 10, while the standard  requires both a 5- and 45-dimensional Higgs.

The sign convention for  varies from article/book to article.

The hypercharge Y/2 is a linear combination (sum) of the following:

There are also the additional fields  and  containing the electroweak Higgs doublets.

theorists.

Since the homotopy group

this model does not predict monopoles. See 't Hooft–Polyakov monopole.

Minimal supersymmetric flipped SU(5)

Spacetime
The  superspace extension of  Minkowski spacetime

Spatial symmetry
 SUSY over  Minkowski spacetime with R-symmetry

Gauge symmetry group

Global internal symmetry

Vector superfields
Those associated with the  gauge symmetry

Chiral superfields
As complex representations:

Superpotential
A generic invariant renormalizable superpotential is a (complex)  invariant cubic polynomial in the superfields which has an -charge of 2. It is a linear combination of the following terms:

In those models without the optional  sterile neutrinos, we add the nonrenormalizable couplings instead.

These couplings do break the R-symmetry.

See also
 Flipped SO(10)

References 

Grand Unified Theory